is a Japanese former sprinter who competed in the 1984 Summer Olympics, in the 1988 Summer Olympics, and in the 1992 Summer Olympics.

Personal bests

Records
200 metres
Former Japanese record holder - 20.74 s (wind: -0.4 m/s) (Kofu, 15 October 1986)
300 metres
Former Japanese record holder - 32.97 s (Chiba, 11 September 1988)
400 metres
Current Japanese record holder - 44.78 s (Tokyo, 16 June 1991)
Former Japanese university record holder - 45.85 s (Walnut, 25 July 1984)
4 × 100 m relay
Former Japanese record holder - 38.90 s (relay leg: 4th) (Seoul, 1 October 1988)
4 × 400 m relay
Former Japanese record holder - 3:01.26 s (relay leg: 2nd) (Tokyo, 31 August 1991)

 with Shinji Aoto, Kenji Yamauchi, and Koji Kurihara
 with Koichi Konakatomi, Takahiro Watanabe, and Koji Ito

International competition record

National championships
He has won the individual national championship 8 times.
 1 win in the 200 metres (1983)
 7 wins in the 400 metres (1982, 1985, 1986, 1987, 1988, 1991, 1992)

References

External links
 
 

1961 births
Living people
People from Fujinomiya, Shizuoka
Sportspeople from Shizuoka Prefecture
Japanese male sprinters
Olympic male sprinters
Olympic athletes of Japan
Athletes (track and field) at the 1984 Summer Olympics
Athletes (track and field) at the 1988 Summer Olympics
Athletes (track and field) at the 1992 Summer Olympics
Asian Games gold medalists for Japan
Asian Games bronze medalists for Japan
Asian Games medalists in athletics (track and field)
Athletes (track and field) at the 1982 Asian Games
Athletes (track and field) at the 1986 Asian Games
Athletes (track and field) at the 1990 Asian Games
Medalists at the 1982 Asian Games
Medalists at the 1986 Asian Games
Medalists at the 1990 Asian Games
World Athletics Championships athletes for Japan
Japan Championships in Athletics winners
Tokai University alumni
20th-century Japanese people